Wojtczak is a Polish surname. Notable people with the surname include:

Edouard Wojtczak (1921–1995), Russian-born Polish footballer
Piotr Wojtczak (born 1963), Polish diplomat

See also
Wojciech

Polish-language surnames